Ageratina tinifolia is a species of flowering plant in the family Asteraceae. It is found in the Andes from southern Colombia (departments of Antioquia, Boyacá, Caldas, Cauca, Cesar, Cundinamarca, Huila, Meta, Nariño, Norte de Santander, Putumayo, Quindío, Risaralda, Santander and Tolima) to Venezuela, where it typically occurs in the transition zone of high Andean forests and páramo vegetation.

Etymology 
The species epithet is derived from the Greek τεινο, "wide", referring to the shape of the flowers. In the publication about the Royal Botanical Expedition to New Granada, headed by Spanish botanist and priest José Celestino Mutis, the Spanish name is registered as "pegajosa". Other reported names for the plant include  "amargoso" in Sumapaz, "ayubara" in the Páramo de las Papas, Cauca, "chilco" in El Cocuy, Boyacá, La Calera, Cundinamarca and Angostura, Antioquia and "chilco amargo" in Soacha, Cundinamarca.

Description 
The species was first described as part of the genus Ageratina in 1970 by King and Rob. Earlier reports include Von Humboldt and Bonpland as "grows in New Granada" and by German botanists as Eupatorium tinifolium by Carl Sigismund Kunth in 1818 and Eupatorium lehmannianum by Friedrich Wilhelm Klatt in 1886.

Distribution 
The plant is a typical species at the transition of the two biomes. To the north on the Altiplano Cundiboyacense in the Cárpatos forest reserve of Guasca, Cundinamarca, the plant is one of the most abundant in the higher elevation areas, dominated by Weinmannia pinnata and Miconia theaezans. Ageratina tinifolia is the most dominant species in the northeastern part of the Llano de Paletará, Coconuco, Cauca. The plant is also abundant in the El Volcán forest reserve of Pamplona, Norte de Santander.

References

Bibliography 
 
 
 
 
 
 

tinifolia
Flora of the Andes
Flora of Colombia
Altiplano Cundiboyacense
Flora of Venezuela
Páramo flora
Plants described in 1970